Jim Harris may refer to:

 Jim Harris (writer) (born 1957), American novelist, author of A Bottle of Rain and the forthcoming As God Looked On
 Jim Harris (illustrator/author) (born 1955), American children's book illustrator
 Jim Harris (politician) (born 1961), Canadian politician and environmentalist, former leader of the Green Party of Canada
 Jim Harris (wrestler) (born 1950), American professional wrestler, better known as Kamala
 Jim Harris (entrepreneur), American businessman, co-founder of Compaq Computer
 Jim Harris, a character in  the film A Sister to Assist 'Er

See also
 James Harris (disambiguation)
 Jimmy Harris (disambiguation)